Duanganong Aroonkesorn (born 6 February 1984) is an internationally elite badminton player from Thailand. She competed at the 2006, 2010 and 2014 Asian Games. Aroonkesorn is a women's doubles specialist who is paired with Kunchala Voravichitchaikul. Her best results with Voravichitchaikul have come in 2010 including a Superseries tournament victory at the 2010 French Open.

Achievements

Asian Championships 
Women's doubles

Southeast Asian Games 
Women's doubles

Summer Universiade 
Women's doubles

World Junior Championships 
Girls' doubles

Asian Junior Championships 
Girls' doubles

BWF Superseries 
The BWF Superseries, which was launched on 14 December 2006 and implemented in 2007, is a series of elite badminton tournaments, sanctioned by the Badminton World Federation (BWF). BWF Superseries levels are Superseries and Superseries Premier. A season of Superseries consists of twelve tournaments around the world that have been introduced since 2011. Successful players are invited to the Superseries Finals, which are held at the end of each year.

Women's doubles

  BWF Superseries Finals tournament
  BWF Superseries Premier tournament
  BWF Superseries tournament

BWF Grand Prix 
The BWF Grand Prix had two levels, the BWF Grand Prix and Grand Prix Gold. It was a series of badminton tournaments sanctioned by the Badminton World Federation (BWF) which was held from 2007 to 2017.

Women's doubles

  BWF Grand Prix Gold tournament
  BWF Grand Prix tournament

BWF International Challenge/Series 
Women's doubles

  BWF International Challenge tournament
  BWF International Series tournament

Record against selected opponents 
Women's doubles results with Kunchala Voravichitchaikul against Superseries Final finalists, World Championships Semi-finalists, and Olympic quarterfinalists.

  Leanne Choo & Renuga Veeran 1–0
 / Petya Nedelcheva & Anastasia Russkikh 1–0
  Cheng Shu & Zhao Yunlei 0–5
  Du Jing & Yu Yang 0–4
  Gao Ling & Huang Sui 0–1
  Wang Xiaoli & Yu Yang 0–5
  Wei Yili & Zhang Yawen 0–3
  Bao Yixin & Zhong Qianxin 0–3
  Xia Huan & Tang Jinhua 0–1
  Tian Qing & Zhao Yunlei 0–1
  Luo Ying & Luo Yu 0–1
  Ma Jin & Tang Yuanting 0–1
  Cheng Wen-hsing & Chien Yu-chin 0–4
  Rikke Olsen & Mette Schjoldager 0–2
  Christinna Pedersen & Kamilla Rytter Juhl 0–4
  Gail Emms & Donna Kellogg 0–3
  Poon Lok Yan & Tse Ying Suet 1–3
  Jwala Gutta & Ashwini Ponnappa 0–1
  Vita Marissa & Nadya Melati 1–2
  Mizuki Fujii & Reika Kakiiwa 1–2
  Miyuki Maeda & Satoko Suetsuna 2–10
  Kumiko Ogura & Reiko Shiota 0–2
  Shizuka Matsuo & Mami Naito 0–4
  Misaki Matsutomo & Ayaka Takahashi 1–2
  Reika Kakiiwa & Miyuki Maeda 0–3
  Lee Hyo-jung & Hwang Yu-mi 0–1
  Lee Hyo-jung & Lee Kyung-won 0–9
  Ha Jung-eun & Kim Min-jung 1–1
  Jung Kyung-eun & Kim Ha-na 0–2
  Chin Eei Hui & Wong Pei Tty 0–5
  Valeria Sorokina & Nina Vislova 1–2
  Jiang Yanmei & Li Yujia 1–2
  Shinta Mulia Sari & Yao Lei 2–0

References 

1984 births
Living people
Duanganong Aroonkesorn
Duanganong Aroonkesorn
Badminton players at the 2006 Asian Games
Badminton players at the 2010 Asian Games
Badminton players at the 2014 Asian Games
Duanganong Aroonkesorn
Asian Games medalists in badminton
Medalists at the 2010 Asian Games
Competitors at the 2001 Southeast Asian Games
Competitors at the 2003 Southeast Asian Games
Competitors at the 2005 Southeast Asian Games
Competitors at the 2007 Southeast Asian Games
Competitors at the 2009 Southeast Asian Games
Competitors at the 2011 Southeast Asian Games
Competitors at the 2015 Southeast Asian Games
Duanganong Aroonkesorn
Duanganong Aroonkesorn
Duanganong Aroonkesorn
Southeast Asian Games medalists in badminton
Duanganong Aroonkesorn
Duanganong Aroonkesorn
Universiade medalists in badminton
Medalists at the 2007 Summer Universiade
Duanganong Aroonkesorn
Duanganong Aroonkesorn